Andriana is a genus of flowering plant in the family Apiaceae, endemic to Madagascar. The genus was first described in 1999.

Species
, Plants of the World Online accepted the following species:
Andriana coursii (Humbert) B.-E.van Wyk
Andriana marojejyensis (Humbert) B.-E.van Wyk
Andriana tsaratananensis (Humbert) B.-E.van Wyk

References

Apioideae
Apioideae genera